Artis Leon Ivey Jr. (August 1, 1963 – September 28, 2022), known professionally as Coolio, was an American rapper. First rising to fame as a member of the gangsta rap group WC and the Maad Circle, Coolio achieved mainstream success as a solo artist in the mid-to-late 1990s with his albums It Takes a Thief (1994), Gangsta's Paradise (1995), and My Soul (1997).

He is best known for his 1995 Grammy Award–winning hit single "Gangsta's Paradise", as well as other singles "Fantastic Voyage" (1994), "1, 2, 3, 4 (Sumpin' New)" (1996), and "C U When U Get There" (1997).

From 1996 on, Coolio released albums independently, and provided the opening track "Aw, Here It Goes!" for the 1996 Nickelodeon television series Kenan & Kel. He created the web series Cookin' with Coolio and released a cookbook.

Early life
Artis Leon Ivey Jr. was born on August 1, 1963, in Monessen, Pennsylvania and was raised mostly in Compton. His mother was a factory worker who divorced his carpenter father and moved to Compton when Ivey was eight years old. Severely asthmatic, Ivey was a regular visitor to his local library as a boy. He started rapping as a teenager, earning the nickname Coolio Iglesias, after Spanish singer Julio Iglesias, which was later shortened to Coolio. He was arrested for bringing a weapon to school and served prison time for larceny. As Compton declined in the 1980s, he became addicted to crack cocaine, but quit drugs after spending time living with his father in San Jose. After attending Compton Community College, he worked in jobs such as volunteer firefighting and security at Los Angeles International Airport, before becoming a rapper.

Music career
Coolio recorded his first single in 1987, titled "Whatcha Gonna Do?". He also recorded "What Makes You Dance (Force Groove)" with Nu-Skool in 1988. Coolio made connections in the L.A. rap scene, and in 1991, ended up joining the group WC and the Maad Circle, led by rapper WC. He is a credited co-contributor on the group's debut album Ain't a Damn Thang Changed, including on the single "Dress Code".

Tommy Boy Records and It Takes a Thief
In 1994, Coolio signed to Tommy Boy Records and released his debut solo album It Takes a Thief. The lead single "Fantastic Voyage" received heavy rotation on MTV and peaked at No. 3 on the Billboard Hot 100. "Fantastic Voyage" would become one of the biggest rap singles of the year. Other minor hits from the album include "County Line" and "I Remember". It Takes a Thief peaked at No. 8 on the Billboard 200, becoming certified Platinum. The album received praise for bringing a humorous and lighthearted perspective to the often violent and profane themes of typical gangsta rap.

Gangsta's Paradise
In 1995, Coolio released "Gangsta's Paradise", featuring R&B singer L.V., for the film Dangerous Minds. It became one of the most successful rap songs of all time, topping on the Billboard Hot 100 for three weeks. It was the No. 1 single of 1995 in the United States for all genres and was a global hit topping the United Kingdom, Ireland, France, Germany, Italy, Sweden, Austria, Netherlands, Norway, Switzerland, Australia, and New Zealand charts. "Gangsta's Paradise" was the second-best-selling single of 1995 in the U.K. The song also created a controversy when Coolio claimed that comedy musician "Weird Al" Yankovic had not asked for permission to make his parody of "Gangsta's Paradise", titled "Amish Paradise". At the 1996 Grammy Awards, the song won Coolio a Grammy Award for Best Rap Solo Performance.

Originally "Gangsta's Paradise" was not meant to be included in one of Coolio's studio albums, but its success led to Coolio not only putting it on his next album but also making it the title track. The title track interpolates the chorus and music of the song "Pastime Paradise" by Stevie Wonder, which was recorded nearly 20 years earlier on Wonder's album Songs in the Key of Life. The album Gangsta's Paradise was released in 1995 and was certified two times Platinum by the RIAA and sold more than two million copies in US alone.

The album contains two other major hits in "1, 2, 3, 4 (Sumpin' New)" and "Too Hot" with J. T. Taylor of Kool & the Gang doing the chorus. Despite no longer being an official member of the group, Coolio appears on the second WC and the Maad Circle album Curb Servin' on the song "In a Twist". In 1996, Coolio had another top 40 hit with the song "It's All the Way Live (Now)" from the soundtrack to the movie Eddie. He is also featured on the song "Hit 'em High" from the soundtrack to the 1996 film Space Jam with B-Real, Method Man, LL Cool J, and Busta Rhymes.

In 2014, the band Falling in Reverse did a cover of "Gangsta's Paradise" for Punk Goes 90s Vol. 2, with Coolio making a cameo in the music video.

Red Hot Organization and Tommy Boy Records dismissal
In 1996, Coolio appeared on the Red Hot Organization's compilation CD America Is Dying Slowly, alongside Biz Markie, Wu-Tang Clan, and Fat Joe, among many other prominent hip-hop artists. The CD meant to raise awareness of the AIDS epidemic among African-American men. That same year, he recorded the music video "Aw, Here It Goes!" for the opening sequence of the Nickelodeon television series Kenan & Kel, which ran for four seasons.

Coolio's third solo album, My Soul, came out in 1997. Although it contains the major hit "C U When U Get There" and the album went platinum, it failed to reach the success of his previous two albums. Coolio was subsequently dropped from the Tommy Boy Records label. Since then, 2001's Coolio.com, 2003's El Cool Magnifico, 2006's The Return of the Gangsta, and 2008's Steal Hear, 2009's From the Bottom 2 the Top, and 2017's Long Live the Thief have not charted on any Billboard chart. He did have a minor hit in the UK in 2006 with "Gangsta Walk" (featuring Snoop Dogg).

While touring with hip-hop duo Insane Clown Posse, Coolio received a tattoo as a homage to the group's fanbase, reading "Jugalo Cool" . He stated that the misspelling was intentional. Coolio performed at the Gathering of the Juggalos.

Coolio is featured on an international collaboration track called "Fuck the DJ" by UK rapper Blacklisted MC, also featuring Bizarre of D12, Adil Omar (from Pakistan), and Uzimon (from Bermuda). The song premiered on music website Noisey from Vice in October 2014.

Television appearances
Coolio appeared as a contestant on Comeback – Die große Chance in 2004 (translated in English as Comeback: The Big Chance), a German talent show featuring artists looking for a comeback.

In the television series Futurama, Coolio made two appearances on the TV series and one appearance in Futurama: Bender's Big Score, a straight-to-video movie for the show. He played Kwanzaa-bot, a rapping robot who spreads awareness about Kwanzaa.

In 2009, Coolio appeared as a housemate on Celebrity Big Brother 6, which he placed 3rd. He later went to appear on the UK's Ultimate Big Brother in 2010, where he decided it was best to leave the house after numerous confrontations with Nadia Almada and others there. In January 2012, he was one of eight celebrities participating in the Food Network reality television series Rachael vs. Guy: Celebrity Cook-Off, where he represented the Music Saves Lives Organization. He also guest-starred as himself on Sabrina the Teenage Witch.

Coolio is featured on the March 5, 2013, episode of the ABC reality program Wife Swap, but his then-girlfriend left him after the program was taped. On June 30, 2013, he appeared alongside comedian Jenny Eclair and Emmerdale actor Matthew Wolfenden on the UK game show Tipping Point: Lucky Stars, where he came in second. On June 30, 2012, Coolio voiced a wax figure of himself on Gravity Falls. He also appears on "Homie-Work", a 1998 episode of The Nanny, in which he portrays a nerdy man, a "gift wrapper", transformed by the Jewish nanny into a "Rapper" for Maxwell Sheffield's new rap musical.

Coolio guest starred on a 2014 episode of the Adult Swim show Black Jesus titled "Gangsta's Paradise". In July 2016, Coolio performed on ABC's Greatest Hits.

Other appearances
In 2019, Coolio appeared on the Irish rap group Versatile's track "Escape Wagon". He later featured on their 2021 album, Fuck Versatile, on the track "Coolio Interlude".

Philanthropy
Coolio and jazz saxophonist Jarez were enlisted in July 2008 as spokespersons by the group Environmental Justice and Climate Change to educate students at historically black colleges and universities about global warming. Coolio was a spokesperson for the Asthma and Allergy Foundation of America. He said that he and his children are asthma sufferers. As a child, he was taken to the hospital several times due to asthma complications.

Legal issues
In 1998, a court in Böblingen near Stuttgart sentenced Coolio to six months probation and fined him $17,000 after convicting him of being an accessory to robbery and causing bodily injury.

In 2016, Coolio and members of his crew were arrested for having a loaded firearm inside of a bookbag at Los Angeles International Airport. The bag was flagged by the Transportation Security Administration as the group attempted to pass through a security checkpoint. One of his bodyguards claimed ownership of the bag, but witnesses stated that it belonged to Coolio himself. Coolio was sentenced to three years of probation and 45 days of community service.

In 2017, Coolio was denied entry into Singapore upon landing at Changi International Airport. Singapore's Immigration and Checkpoints Authority declined to comment on the reason for the denial, citing reasons of confidentiality. Coolio had been traveling from Beijing to Singapore to perform at a Formula One concert event.

Personal life
Coolio had ten children, one of whom was born to his wife, Josefa Salinas, whom he married in 1996 and divorced in 2000. In March 2022, he told Australia's Today Extra that he had five grandchildren.

Coolio was the running mate for pornographic actress Cherie DeVille's Democratic presidential run in 2020.

Death 
On September 28, 2022, while at a friend's house in Los Angeles, California, Coolio was discovered unresponsive on a bathroom floor. He was pronounced dead by first responders. He was 59 years old. Police opened an investigation into his death, though foul play was not suspected, and Coolio's manager stated he appeared to have suffered cardiac arrest.

Coolio was cremated in a private ceremony with no funeral service. His ashes were then encased in jewelry for his family, with the rest of his ashes going into an urn.

Discography

Studio albums
 It Takes a Thief (1994)
 Gangsta's Paradise (1995)
 My Soul (1997)
 Coolio.com (2001)
 El Cool Magnifico (2002)
 The Return of the Gangsta (2006)
 Steal Hear (2008)
 From the Bottom 2 the Top (2009)

Collaboration albums
 Ain't a Damn Thang Changed with WC and the Maad Circle (1991)

Filmography

Film

Television

Awards and nominations 

Coolio's 1995 song "Gangsta's Paradise", a remake of Stevie Wonder's "Pastime Paradise" received several awards, including Best Rap Solo Performance at the Grammy Awards and Best Rap Video and Best Video from a Film at the MTV Video Music Awards. Coolio himself received several awards, including Favorite Rap/Hip Hop Artist at the American Music Awards in 1996. At the Grammy Awards in 1997, Coolio received three nominations: Best Rap Album for Gangsta's Paradise, Best Rap Solo Performance for "1, 2, 3, 4 (Sumpin' New)", and Best R&B Vocal Performance by a Duo or Group for "Stomp". Overall, Coolio received five awards from fourteen nominations.

American Music Awards
The American Music Awards is an annual awards ceremony created by Dick Clark in 1973. Coolio received one award from two nominations.

|-
|  || Coolio || Favorite Rap/Hip Hop Artist || 
|-
|  || Coolio || Favorite Rap/Hip-Hop Artist ||

Grammy Awards
The Grammy Awards are awarded annually by the National Academy of Recording Arts and Sciences of the United States. Coolio received one award from six nominations.

|-
|  || "Fantastic Voyage" || Best Rap Solo Performance || 
|-
|rowspan="2"|  ||rowspan="2"| "Gangsta's Paradise" || Record of the Year || 
|-
| Best Rap Solo Performance || 
|-
|rowspan="3"|  || Gangsta's Paradise || Best Rap Album || 
|-
| "1, 2, 3, 4 (Sumpin' New)" || Best Rap Solo Performance || 
|-
| "Stomp" || Best R&B Vocal Performance by a Duo or Group || 

 "Stomp" with Luke Cresswell, Fiona Wilkes, Carl Smith, Fraser Morrison, Everett Bradley, Mr. X, Melle Mel, Coolio, Yo-Yo, Chaka Khan, Charlie Wilson, Shaquille O'Neal, Luniz

MTV Video Music Awards
The MTV Video Music Awards is an annual awards ceremony established in 1984 by MTV. Coolio received three awards from six nominations.

|-
|  || "Fantastic Voyage" || Best Rap Video || 
|-
|rowspan="5"|  ||rowspan="3"| "Gangsta's Paradise" || Best Rap Video || 
|-
| Best Video from a Film || 
|-
| Viewer's Choice || 
|-
|rowspan="2"| "1, 2, 3, 4 (Sumpin' New)" || Best Dance Video || 
|-
| Best Male Video ||

References

External links

 
 
 
 

1963 births
2022 deaths
African-American male actors
African-American male rappers
American male film actors
American male television actors
American male voice actors
Grammy Award winners for rap music
Musicians from Compton, California
Rappers from Los Angeles
Tommy Boy Records artists
Pop rappers
21st-century American rappers
WC and the Maad Circle members
21st-century American male musicians
21st-century American politicians
West Coast hip hop musicians
Politicians from Los Angeles
21st-century African-American politicians
20th-century African-American people